Rolla Ranger Station Historic District is a historic ranger station and national historic district located at Mark Twain National Forest near Rolla, Phelps County, Missouri.  The station includes five frame and limestone buildings constructed by the Civilian Conservation Corps (CCC) during 1937 and 1938.  They were built under the supervision of a Works Progress Administration (WPA) project.  They are a ranger's office, dwelling, garage, warehouse and oil house.  The ranger's office and dwelling are 1 1/2-story, Colonial Revival influenced buildings.

It was listed on the National Register of Historic Places in 2003.

References

Rolla, Missouri
Civilian Conservation Corps in Missouri
Works Progress Administration in Missouri
Historic districts on the National Register of Historic Places in Missouri
Colonial Revival architecture in Missouri
Government buildings completed in 1938
Buildings and structures in Phelps County, Missouri
National Register of Historic Places in Phelps County, Missouri